Muhammad VI  may refer to:
 Muhammad Imaaduddeen VI (1868–1932), sultan of the Maldives from 1893 to 1902
 Mehmed VI (1861–1926), sultan of Ottoman Empire, from 1918 to 1922
 Mohammed VI of Morocco (born 1963), King of Morocco since 1999